María Emilia: Querida is a Peruvian telenovela produced by José Enrique Crousillat for América Producciones. It is an adaptation of the 1979 telenovela titled Emilia, written by Delia Fiallo, and was adapted for television in 1999 by Ximena Suárez. The telenovela is stars by the Venezuelan actress Coraima Torres, and the Mexican actor Juan Soler.

Plot 
María Emilia (Coraima Torres) lives with her grandmother and her two brothers. These are very capricious and do not care that María Emilia works every day to support her family. Mónica (Ana Patricia Rojo), her sister is very ambitious and her desire is to leave the humble neighborhood where they live and marry a millionaire. For that reason she tries to make Francisco (Roberto Sen), a rich businessman, fall in love with her. María Emilia gets another job to be able to earn more money as a teacher for Francisco's youngest daughter, there she will meet Alejandro (Juan Soler), also Francisco's son. María Emilia falls in love with Alejandro, and he who has no interest in falling in love only plays with her, but little by little he will begin to feel attraction for her.

Cast 
 Juan Soler as Alejandro Aguirre González
 Coraima Torres as María Emilia Pardo-Figueroa Núñez
 Ana Patricia Rojo as Mónica Pardo-Figueroa Núñez
 Ana Bertha Espín as Yolanda González de Aguirre
 Meche Solaeche as Hortencia González de Briceño
 Orlando Fundichely as Eduardo "Lalo" Méndez
 Roberto Sen as Francisco Aguirre
 Roberto Moll as Esteban Briceño
 Silvana Arias as Susana "Susanita" Peña
 Ernesto Cabrejos as Don Prudencio Jara
 Stephanie Cayo as Gabriela "Gaby" Aguirre González
 Giovanni Ciccia as Ricardo Murguía
 Javier Delgiudice as Ernesto Falcón

References

External links 
 

1999 telenovelas
1999 Peruvian television series debuts
2000 Peruvian television series endings
Peruvian telenovelas
América Televisión telenovelas